The Ross Creek, part of the Ross River catchment, is a minor creek in the upper reaches of the river catchment, located southwest of Townsville, in North Queensland, Australia.

Course and features
The creek flows generally southeast before reaching its confluence with the Ross River on the western banks of the Ross River Dam. The creek descends  over its  course.

See also

References

External links

Geography of Townsville
Rivers of Queensland